Zhou Jianping (born January 13, 1957) is a Chinese aerospace engineer who is the chief designer of Shenzhou program. He belongs to the 3rd generation of Chinese space engineers. He was a member of the 12th National Committee of the Chinese People's Political Consultative Conference.

Biography
Zhou was born in Wangcheng County (now Wangcheng District of Changsha), Hunan province in 1957. After the resumption of college entrance examination, he was admitted to Dalian University of Technology, where he obtained his master's degree in engineering mechanics in 1984. He received his doctor's degree in solid mechanics from National University of Defense Technology in October 1989. He joined the Shenzhou program in April 2000. In October 2019, he was elected chief designer of Shenzhou program.

Honours and awards
 1999 Distinguished Young Scholar by the National Science Fund for Distinguished Young Scholars
 2013 Member of the Chinese Academy of Engineering (CAE)
 2016 Guanghua Engineering Science and Technology Award

References

1957 births
Living people
People from Changsha
Engineers from Hunan
Dalian University of Technology alumni
National University of Defense Technology alumni
Members of the Chinese Academy of Engineering